Utricularia neottioides is a perennial, affixed aquatic carnivorous plant that belongs to the genus Utricularia (family Lentibulariaceae). It is a mat-forming rheophyte that is attached to rocks in the shallows of swiftly moving water. It is endemic to South America and is found in the countries of Colombia, Venezuela, Brazil, and Bolivia.

See also 
 List of Utricularia species

References 

Carnivorous plants of South America
Flora of Bolivia
Flora of Brazil
Flora of Colombia
Flora of Venezuela
neottioides